Pseudodolbina aequalis is a moth of the  family Sphingidae. It is known from India.

References

Sphingini
Moths described in 1903